Jenny Perlin (born 1970) is an American artist.

Education
Perlin earned a Bachelor of Arts in Literature and Society from Brown University and her Masters of Fine Arts from the School of the Art Institute of Chicago in Film.

Collections
Her work is included in the collections of the Whitney Museum of American Art, the Seattle Art Museum and the Museum of Modern Art, New York.,the School of the Art Institute of Chicago

Publications

Maelstrom, 2020
the first one hundred: The Hoosac Institute, 2020
The Measures, 2018
The Same Moon Everywhere, 2014
Perseverance and How to Develop It, 2006

References

1970 births
Living people
21st-century American women artists
21st-century American artists
American filmmakers
American women film directors
Brown University alumni